The Ministry of Science and Technology ,  wazarat-e- science o technology (abbreviated as MoST) is a Cabinet-level Ministry of the Government of Pakistan concerned with Science and Technology in Pakistan and in general, Pakistan's science policy, planning, coordination and directing of efforts to initiate and launch scientific and technological programs as well as projects aimed at economic development.

The ministry is coordinated by the Federal Minister for Science and Technology who is currently Agha Hassan Baloch and is headquartered in Islamabad.

Mission 
To achieve the security, prosperity and social cohesion of Pakistan through equitable and sustainable socio-economic progress using science, technology and innovation as central pillars of development in all sectors of economic activity.

The principle agenda of the MoST is building Pakistan's technological competence in the 21st century by leap forging into new markets, develop a larger pool of human resource for reverse brain drain and integrate the soft technology infrastructure into hard modern technological base, strengthen technology institutions, effective S & TR governance and enhance the capacity if indigenous innovation systems.

Federal Ministers/Ministers of State/Advisers/In-charge, Ministry of Science and Technology
 
The Scientific and Technological Research Division (S&TRD) established in 1964 was initially responsible to administrate the National Science Council, the Council of Scientific and Industrial Research, the Atomic Energy Commission and the Space and Upper Atmospheric Research Committee. The status of S&TR Division was raised to the level of full-fledged Ministry of Science and Technology “MoST” in 1972.

Organizations 
The following organizations are situated under the Ministry of Science and Technology:-
National University of Sciences and Technology, Pakistan(NUST)
 COMSATS University Islamabad (CUI)
Council for Work and Housing Research(CWHR)
 National Institute of Electronics (Pakistan) (NIE)
 National Institute of Oceanography (Pakistan)( NIO)
National University of Technology (NUTECH)
Pakistan Council for Renewable Energy Technologies (PCRET)
Pakistan Council of Research in Water Resources (PCRWR)
Pakistan Council for Science and Technology (PCST)
 Pakistan Council of Scientific and Industrial Research (PCSIR)
 Pakistan Engineering Council (PEC)
 Pakistan National Accreditation Council (PNAC)
 Pakistan Science Foundation (PSF)
Pakistan Museum of Natural History (PMNH)
Pakistan Scientific and Technological Information Center (PASTIC)
 Pakistan Standards and Quality Control Authority (PSQCA)
Pakistan Halal Authority (PHA) 
STEDEC Technology Commercialization Corporation of Pakistan (Private) limited

PakMoonSighting.pk

The ministry launched a lunar observatory website in 2019 aimed at to show the citizens about the Islamic events, holidays, and primarily crescent associated with lunar calendar dates. The website claims to have modern features such as predetermine the future-dates or arrival of Ramadan, Eid al-Fitr, Eid al-Adha and other events based on scientific evidences and observations through moon sighting.

See also
Government of Pakistan
Politics of Pakistan
Ministry of Maritime Affairs (Pakistan)

References

External links 
MoST official website

Science and technology ministries
Federal government ministries of Pakistan
Science and technology in Pakistan
1964 establishments in Pakistan